Cromartyshire was an iron sailing vessel with three masts that was built in 1879 by Russell & Co Port Glasgow (yard No 19) for Thomas Law & Co, Glasgow. La Bourgogne sank, resulting in the loss of 571 passengers and crew members while Cromartyshire suffered severe hull loss but was towed into Halifax Harbour by the Allan Line Royal Mail Steamer SS Grecian and managed to get repairs at Halifax, Nova Scotia. In 1901 on a voyage from Leith to Port Elizabeth, Cromartyshire was abandoned on fire off Mossel Bay, but subsequently retrieved. On 24 October 1906, after leaving Antofagasta to load at Iquique, she ran aground on offshore rocks and was destroyed.

References
 Clyde Ships

See also

1879 ships
Maritime incidents in 1898
Maritime incidents in 1901
Maritime incidents in 1906
Sailing ships of Scotland